Ephoria eadgara is a moth in the Apatelodidae family. It was described by Schaus in 1934. It is found in Brazil.

Original publication
As Colabata eadgara, in

References

Natural History Museum Lepidoptera generic names catalog

Apatelodidae
Moths described in 1934